Diamond grinding is a grinding process that can be applied to a variety of surfaces including floors, stones, and engineering ceramics.  It takes advantage of the fact that diamond has the highest hardness of any bulk material.

See also
 Diamond grinding of pavement
 Diamond grinding cup wheel

Grinding and lapping